Vosseler is a surname. Notable people with the surname include: 

 Hans Vosseler (b. 1949), German swimmer and Olympic medalist
 Heidi Vosseler (1918–1992), ballerina
 Heinrich Franz Vosseler (1885–1975), New Zealand engineer and oil refinery owner
 Mardee Vosseler (d. 1941), ballerina, sister of Heidi Vosseler
 Martin Vosseler, co-founder of Physicians for Social Responsibility